Annie Burgstede (born Anna Louise Burgstede on September 18, 1983, in Waupaca, Wisconsin) is an American actress.

Annie initially began her run on Days of Our Lives in October 2006 in a recurring capacity, but after only a few episodes was upgraded to contract status. Initially known only as Willow, the character's last name was revealed to be Stark in January 2007. Burgstede left Days of Our Lives on June 5, 2007.

Filmography

Film

Television

Other work

Notes

External links
 
 
 Annie Burgstede at the TV.com
 Annie Burgstede's fansite

American television actresses
American film actresses
American soap opera actresses
1983 births
Living people
Actresses from Wisconsin
People from Waupaca, Wisconsin
21st-century American actresses